Matei is a commune in Bistrița-Năsăud County, Transylvania, Romania. It is composed of six villages: Bidiu (Bödön), Corvinești (Kékesújfalu), Enciu (Szászencs), Fântânele (Újős), Matei, and Moruț (Aranyosmóric).

The commune lies on the Transylvanian Plateau.

At the 2011 census, 52.3% of inhabitants were Romanians, 40.6% Hungarians, 5.8% Roma, and 1.2% Germans.

Natives
Ioan Nagy

References

Communes in Bistrița-Năsăud County
Localities in Transylvania